Corrigan Park is a Gaelic games ground on the Whiterock Road in west Belfast that served as the main venue for GAA in Belfast until the opening of Casement Park in 1953. It is named in honour of Sean Corrigan, mentor of the Brian Óg club who were Antrim's first hurling champions. In 2021 following extensive renovations which included the construction of a 600-seat stand and terracing, the capacity of the park increased from 2,100 to 3,700.

Current
It is home to the St John's club. It regularly hosts Ulster club and colleges matches at second and third level.

History

Hurling
Corrigan Park was associated with the run of the Antrim hurling team to the final of the 1943 All-Ireland championship, Corrigan Park staged the quarter-final in which Antrim beat Galway and the semi-final in which Antrim beat Kilkenny, both unexpected results at the time. Its tight, confined space was regarded as being advantageous to the home side in those matches.

Football
Among the major football championship matches it staged were the Cavan-Antrim Ulster championship semi-finals of 1930, 1931 and 1949. Its last major provincial football championship match was Antrim v Donegal in the Ulster championship of 1952.

However, Corrigan Park hosted Antrim's Round 2 Qualifier defeat to Kildare in the 2019 All-Ireland Senior Football Championship.

Camogie
Corrigan Park staged the All Ireland Camogie finals of 1944, 1946, and 1947, two of which were won by Antrim, and also several of Antrim's semi-finals. It became known as the home of camogie during this period.

References

External links
 St John's website

Antrim GAA
Gaelic games grounds in Northern Ireland
Sports venues completed in 1927
Sports venues in Belfast